Henry Victor Dyson Dyson (7 April 1896 – 6 June 1975), generally known as Hugo Dyson and who signed his writings H. V. D. Dyson, was an English academic and a member of the Inklings literary group.  He was a committed Christian, and together with J. R. R. Tolkien he helped C. S. Lewis to convert to Christianity, particularly after a long conversation as they strolled on Addison's Walk at Oxford.

Career

Academia
Dyson taught English at the University of Reading from 1924 until obtaining a fellowship with Merton College, Oxford, in 1945. His students at Oxford included the later cultural theorist Stuart Hall, whom he tutored in the early 1950s. Dyson retired in 1963 but returned as emeritus fellow in 1969, teaching the newly introduced "modern" literature paper. His tutorials were notable because many of the writers he discussed had been personal friends.

Works
Dyson was not a prolific writer, but the quality and voluminous quantity of his lectures and general conversation had quite an effect on people. He wrote the introduction of his first published book Poetry and Prose (1933), which is a collection of works of Alexander Pope with notes by Dyson. Another of his few publications is Augustans and Romantics, 1689–1830 (1940), a survey of contemporary English literature with a bibliography by Professor John Butt.

Dyson preferred talk at Inklings meetings to readings. He had a distaste for J. R. R. Tolkien's The Lord of the Rings and complained loudly at its readings. Eventually Tolkien gave up reading to the group altogether.

Television and film
Dyson, an expert on Shakespeare, was asked during the early 1960s to host some televised lectures and plays about the writer. Dyson's relaxed style resulted in him being cast in a small part in the 1965 film Darling as Professor Walter Southgate, a major literary character.

Personal life
Hugo Dyson lived at 32 Sandfield Road in the east Oxford suburb of Headington until his death. He is buried in Holywell Cemetery, Oxford.

Filmography

References

External links

1896 births
1975 deaths
Academics of the University of Reading
Fellows of Merton College, Oxford
Inklings
Burials at Holywell Cemetery